The Hungarian minor scale, double harmonic minor scale, or Gypsy minor scale is a type of combined musical scale. It is the fourth mode of the double harmonic scale. It is the same as the harmonic minor scale, except that it has a raised fourth scale degree to introduce an additional gap, or augmented second. It is a symmetrical scale with a slightly ambiguous tonal centre, due to the many half steps.

Its step pattern is W, H, +, H, H, +, H, where W indicates a whole step, H indicates a half step, and + indicates an augmented second (three half steps, enharmonically equivalent to a minor third but functionally distinct). While in intervallic terms, it would be described as: 1 2 3 4 5 6 7.
The scale contains two augmented seconds, one in each tetrachord. It also contains an augmented fourth between the first and fourth degree.
This scale (and its modes like the double harmonic scale) is the one perfectly balanced seven-note subset of the equally tempered chromatic scale: when its pitches are represented as points in a circle whose full circumference represents an octave, their average position (or "centre of mass") is the centre of the circle.
Other examples include the Dorian mode of major and fifth mode of melodic minor. 
The axis of balance for the Hungarian minor passes through the fifth and the flat nine, which is not included in the pitch set.

The scale may be used with minor or m+7 chords. See: chord-scale system. Chords that may be derived from the B Hungarian minor scale are Bm(maj7), C#75, Dmaj7#5, E#6sus2b5, F#maj7, Gmaj7, G7, A#m6 and more.

This scale is obtainable from the double harmonic scale by starting from the fourth of that scale, so the C Hungarian minor scale is equivalent to the G double harmonic scale.

In Indian classical Carnatic music, Hungarian minor scale corresponds to Simhendramadhyamam, while the Gypsy variant corresponds to Shanmukhapriya.

This scale is sometimes also referred to as "Gypsy Run", or alternatively "Egyptian Minor Scale", as mentioned by Miles Davis who describes it in his autobiography as "something that I'd learned at Juilliard".

An alternative (and less common) version is the asymmetric Aeolian ♯4 scale, the only difference with the Hungarian minor scale being that the 7th degree of the scale is not raised. This form of the scale can also be used in the fourth mode and would then be referred to as the Neapolitan scale.

Usage
Measures 5–6 of Liszt's Hungarian Rhapsody No. 2.

Tchaikovsky’s piece, “Marche slave”, has a main theme using the Hungarian minor scale.

The Pink Panther Theme, originally played in the key of E minor, is noted for its quirky, unusual use of chromaticism which is derived from this scale.

Joe Satriani has composed several songs using the Hungarian minor scale ("Musterion").

Oli Herbert of the American melodic metalcore band All That Remains uses the Hungarian minor scale in his playing ("Become the Catalyst").

Cannibal Corpse's song "Rabid" off of their Torture album is written in the Hungarian minor scale.

The second section of Klaus Schulze's long composition "Ludwig II" from the album X has a theme built on an ascending Hungarian minor scale.

The song "Worth It" by Fifth Harmony features a saxophone riff written in this scale.

The theme tune from the 1983 animated TV series "Inspector Gadget" uses this scale.

In a song by Will Wood, BlackBoxWarrior - OKULTRA, Will references "A hymn out in Hungarian Harmonic". Following this lyric is a walk up the Hungarian Minor scale.

Modes
{| class="wikitable"
|-
! align="center" | Mode
! align="center" | Name of scale
! colspan="8" align="center" | Degrees
|-
| align="center" | 1
| Double Harmonic Minor || 1 || 2 || 3 || 4 || 5 || 6 || 7 || 8
|-
| align="center" | 2
| Oriental || 1 || 2 || 3 || 4 || 5 || 6 || 7 || 8
|-
| align="center" | 3
| Ionian 2 5 || 1 || 2 || 3 || 4 || 5 || 6 || 7 || 8
|-
| align="center" | 4
| Locrian 3 7 || 1 || 2 || 3|| 4 || 5 || 6 || 7 || 8
|-
| align="center" | 5
| Double harmonic major or Phrygian Dominant 7 || 1 || 2 || 3 || 4 || 5 || 6 || 7 || 8
|-
| align="center" | 6
| Lydian 2 6 || 1 || 2 || 3 || 4 || 5 || 6 || 7 || 8
|-
| align="center" | 7
| Ultraphrygian or Phrygian 4 7 || 1 || 2 || 3 || 4 || 5 || 6 || 7 || 8
|}

See also
Hungarian major scale
Ukrainian Dorian scale
Phrygian dominant scale
Double harmonic scale
Gypsy scale
Verbunkos

References

Further reading
Hewitt, Michael. 2013. Musical Scales of the World. The Note Tree. .

External links
Hungarian minor scale mapped out for guitar
Hungarian minor scale theme
Hungarian minor scale – analysis
http://jguitar.com/scale/C%23/Hungarian%20Gypsy - Illustration of the scale on a guitar of Double Harmonic variety
Illustration of the scale on a guitar of Aeolian #4 as Hungarian Gypsy
http://dragonguitar.com/play/guitar/hungarian-minor-scales/a – Diagram of A Hungarian minor

Heptatonic scales
Hemitonic scales
Tritonic scales
Musical scales with augmented seconds